The Solomon Islands national rugby union team represent Solomon Islands in the sport of rugby union.

They played their first internationals as part of the 3rd South Pacific Games in Port Moresby, beginning with a 5–23 loss to host team Papua New Guinea on 18 August 1969. Their first wins came soon after; 36–0 over Wallis and Futuna and 28–12 against New Caledonia to win the bronze medal. Since then have played in only a small number of internationals, but did win bronze again in Port Moresby at the 9th South Pacific Games.

Solomon Islands have yet to qualify for the Rugby World Cup finals. The team did take part in the qualifying tournaments in Oceania for the 2003 Rugby World Cup in Australia, and the 2007 Rugby World Cup in France, but did not end up qualifying.

History
In November and December 2011, Solomon Islands competed in the Eastern Regional Pool of the 2011 FORU Oceania Cup. All matches were played at Lloyd Robson Oval in Port Moresby. In their first match, on 29 November, Solomon Islands recorded a notable 22–19 victory over the more fancied former champions Niue. This was followed by a 33–15 loss to host nation, Papua New Guinea. In their final pool match, Solomon Islands defeated Vanuatu 48–20 to finish second in the pool, behind Papua New Guinea. This victory set a new record winning margin for the Solomon Islands, eclipsing the previous best of 11–3, also against Vanuatu, in 2001. By virtue of their wins at the tournament, Solomon Islands climbed to an all-time high of 69th position on the IRB World Rankings, overtaking Niue in the process.

Record

World Cup

Overall

Current squad
On July 30, the 31-man squad was selected for the 2019 Oceania Rugby Cup.

External links
 Solomon Islands on IRB.com
 Solomon Islands on Rugbydata.com
 Solomon Islands at the Federation of Oceania Rugby Unions (FORU)
Solomon Islands Official Games

References

Oceanian national rugby union teams
Rugby union in the Solomon Islands